Talmo is an unincorporated community in Republic County, Kansas, United States.  It is located northeast of Concordia along K-148 highway between Co Rd 19 and Co Rd 20.

History
A post office was opened in Talmo in 1884, and remained in operation until it was discontinued in 1953.

Education
The community is served by Republic County USD 109 public school district.

References

Further reading

External links
 Republic County maps: Current, Historic, KDOT

Unincorporated communities in Republic County, Kansas
Unincorporated communities in Kansas